Aubrey High School is a public high school located in the city of Aubrey, Texas, USA and classified as a 4A school by the UIL.  It is a part of the Aubrey Independent School District located in east central Denton County and serves students in Aubrey and Krugerville.  In 2015, the school was rated "Met Standard" by the Texas Education Agency.

Athletics
The Aubrey Chaparrals compete in these sports:

Marching Band, Volleyball, Cross Country, Football, Basketball, Powerlifting, Golf, Baseball & Softball.

Academics
Aubrey High School also runs a number of academically-focused teams to compete in UIL tournaments.

References

External links
Aubrey ISD website

Public high schools in Texas
High schools in Denton County, Texas